The People's Party (Stronnictwo Ludowe, SL) was a Polish political party, active from 1931 in the Second Polish Republic. An agrarian populist party, its power base was mostly farmers and rural population.

In 1931 it was created from the merger of three other, smaller, peasant-based parties: centre-right Polish People's Party "Piast" (PSL "Piast"), centre-left Polish People's Party "Wyzwolenie" (PSLW) and left wing Stronnictwo Chłopskie (SCh).

During the Second World War it was known as 'Stronnictwo Ludowe Roch' and its military arm, Bataliony Chłopskie, was part of the Polish resistance movement in World War II.

After the end of the war, the People's Party under the leadership of Wincenty Witos decided to support Stanisław Mikołajczyk. However at the same time Polish communists named one of their proxy parties , and the old People's Party, now loyal to Mikołajczyk, changed its name into Polish People's Party (PSL).

After Mikołajczyk's defeat in the rigged 1947 Polish legislative election, the remains of the Polish People's Party were merged (in 1949) into the communist-allied United People's Party (ZSL).

References

1931 establishments in Poland
Agrarian parties in Poland
Centrist parties in Poland
Defunct political parties in Poland
Liberal parties in Poland
Political parties disestablished in 1949
Political parties established in 1931
Polish People's Party